Hilda Marjanne was a Canadian straight deck bulk carrier operating on the Great Lakes.

Ship history

Oil tanker
The ship was built at the Kaiser Shipyard in Swan Island, Oregon, for the U.S. Maritime Commission as a Type T2-SE-A1 tanker and launched on 9 December 1943 as the Grande Ronde.

Grande Ronde was chartered to Los Angeles Tanker Operations, Inc. of Los Angeles, California, for wartime service, primarily in the Pacific Theater.

In 1948 the Grande Ronde was sold to the Cephalonian Maritime Company of Athens, Greece. Renamed Kate N.L. she operated in the Mediterranean Sea transporting petroleum products.

Bulk carrier
In 1960 she was sold to Leitch Transport Ltd. of Toronto, Ontario, and towed to the Schlieker-Werft shipyard in Hamburg, West Germany, to be converted to a bulk carrier.

The ship, renamed Hilda Marjanne, returned to Canada in August 1961 for service on the Great Lakes transporting grain and iron ore.

Hilda Marjanne was laid up at Hamilton, Ontario on June 13, 1983. The bows and midsection (minus the forward wheelhouse, stern accommodations and machinery) of Hilda Marjanne were then joined to the stern section of the freighter Chimo at the Port Weller Dry Docks, St. Catharines, Ontario. The remaining unwanted sections of both ships were scrapped. The new ship was completed on April 5, 1984, as the bulk carrier Canadian Ranger, which served as a grain transporter until laid up in 2008. She was scrapped in Aliağa, Turkey, in 2011.

References

External links
 

1943 ships
Type T2-SE-A1 tankers
Merchant ships of Greece
Merchant ships of Canada
Great Lakes freighters
Ships built in Portland, Oregon